The Baramati district was under consideration to be divided from the Pune district in accordance with a proposal made on 12 December 2012. A separate Baramati district was to be carved out of the existing Pune district, and the new district would include the eastern parts of Pune district – specifically Shirur, Purandar, Daund, Baramati and Indapur talukas, together with Phaltan taluka from the neighbouring Satara district. However, there are no plans in the near future for creating a separate Baramati district.

Baramati's current industrial growth and capacity to manufacture international products in MIDC Baramati makes the tehsil a very good prospect of becoming a district in its own right.

References

Pune district
Proposed districts in Maharashtra
Pune division